Dolma (Turkish for "stuffed") is a family of stuffed dishes associated with Ottoman cuisine, typically made with a filling of rice, minced meat, offal, seafood, fruit, or any combination of these inside a vegetable or a leaf wrapping. Wrapped dolma, specifically, are known as sarma, made by rolling grape, cabbage, or other leaves around the filling. Dolma can be served warm or at room temperature and are common in modern cuisines of regions and nations that once were part of the Ottoman Empire.

History

Stuffed vegetable dishes have been a part of Middle Eastern cuisine for centuries. Recipes for stuffed eggplant have been found in Medieval Arabic cookbooks and, in Ancient Greek cuisine, fig leaves stuffed with sweetened cheese were called . The word dolma, of Turkish origin, means "something stuffed" or "filled". (A Turkish share taxi is called a dolmuş for similar reasons). In some of the former Ottoman countries, native names have been retained or have blended with Turkish language terms, for example, in the Arab states of the Persian Gulf and Damascus, stuffed leaves are called mahshi yabraq or mahshi brag, a combination of the Turkish word for leaf (yaprak) and the Arabic term for stuffed (mahshi). 

Several dolma recipes were recorded in 19th-century Iran by Naser al-Din Shah Qajar's chef, including stuffed vine leaves, cabbage leaves, cucumbers, eggplants, apples, and quinces, with varied fillings prepared with ground meat, sauteed mint leaves, rice and saffron. Iraqi Jewish families have a version of dolma with sweet and sour flavors that were not found in other versions. Dolma are part of cuisine of the Sephardic Jews as well. Jews in the Ottoman Empire used locally grown grape leaves and adopted the Turkish name of the dish.

During winter months cabbage was a staple food for peasants in Persia and the Ottoman Empire, and it spread to the Balkans as well. Jews in Eastern Europe prepared variations of stuffed cabbage rolls with kosher meat—this dish is called golubtsy in Russian, holubtsi in Ukrainian, gołąbki in Polish and holishkes in Yiddish.  As meat was expensive, rice was sometimes mixed in with the meat. Jews in Europe would sometimes substitute barley, bread or kasha (barley porridge) for the rice. In the Persian Gulf, basmati rice is preferred, and the flavor of the stuffing may be enhanced using tomatoes, onions and cumin. Cabbage rolls entered Swedish cuisine (where they are known as kåldolmar) after Charles XII, defeated by the Russians at the battle of Poltava, returned to Sweden in 1715 with his Turkish creditors and their cooks.

Distribution
Dolma dishes are found in Balkan, Southern Caucasian, Middle Eastern, North African, Mesopotamian, Persian, Israeli, Turkish,  Maghrebi and Central Asian cuisine. 

In 2017, dolma making in Azerbaijan was included in the UNESCO Intangible Cultural Heritage Lists.

Variants
There are many varieties of the zeytinyağlı (with olive oil) and sağyağlı (with clarified butter) dolmas. The zeytinyağlı dolmas are usually stuffed with rice and served cold with a garlic-yogurt sauce, but variations with meat based fillings are served warm, often with tahini or avgolemono sauce.

Stuffed vine leaves

 
The origins of stuffed vine leaves are unknown. They can be made with meat or grain fillings, and served with garlic yogurt, tarbiya or sweet and sour sauces made with pomegranate syrup and sour cherries. They are known as dolmeh in Iran, dolmades in Greece, tolma in Armenia, yarpaq dolması in Azerbaijan and yebra in Syria.  Egyptians call this main course mahshi (also spelled mashi or mashy). but traditionally, cabbage is used in the winter and vine leaves are used in the summer. Stuffed vine leaves without any meat, called yalancı dolma in Turkish, are served at room temperature.

Cabbage rolls

In several countries, cabbage rolls are stuffed with beans and tart fruits. It is wrapped with cabbage leaves, and stuffed with red beans, garbanzo beans, lentils, cracked wheat, tomato paste, onion and many spices and flavorings. Cabbage rolls are called Pasuts tolma (պասուց տոլմա) (Lenten dolma) in Armenian where they are of seven different grains – chickpea, bean, lentil, cracked wheat, pea, rice and maize. Armenian cooks sometimes use rose hip syrup to flavor stuffed cabbage rolls. Cabbage rolls also known as kalam dolmasi in Azerbaijan

Vegetables
Mülebbes dolma is a historic recipe from the Ottoman era. Halep dolması—named for Aleppo—is a dish of eggplants stuffed with a meat and rice filling that is flavored with spices and either sour plum flavoring syrup or lemon juice. Şalgam dolma are stuffed Russian turnips.

 Soğan dolması ("soğan" meaning "onion" in Turkish), or stuffed onions, are a traditional dish in Bosnia, considered the specialty of Mostar. Ingredients include onions, minced beef, rice, oil, tomato purée, paprika, vinegar or sour cream, strained yogurt (locally known as kiselo mlijeko, literally "sour milk"), black pepper, salt and spices. After the onion's skin is removed, the larger, external, layers (leaves) of onion bulbs are used as containers, so-called "shirts" (Old Turk. "dolama(n)" for a special kind of Ottoman robe) for the meat stuffing. The remaining part of the onion is also used, mixed with the meat and fried on oil for a couple of minutes, to obtain the base of the stuffing. To extract the separate "shirts", the entire bulbs are cut on the top and then boiled until soft enough to be pried off, layer by layer. In order to prevent a further softening and crumbling, the bulbs should be blanched. The "shirts" are removed from the bulbs by slow and gentle finger pressure. Filled "shirts" ("dolme") are boiled slowly at low heat in broth. The level of liquid should be sufficient to cover the dolmas entirely. Sogan-dolma are usually served with dense natural yogurt.

Enginar dolması is stuffed whole artichoke hearts. They may be stuffed with seasoned rice or ground meat cooked in fresh tomato sauce with aleppo pepper. Celery root may be substituted for the artichoke.

A regional specialty from Mardin is a mixed dolma platter. The sumac and Urfa pepper seasoned rice filling is first wrapped with onion layers, vine leaves, and cabbage. The remainder of the rice is used to fill eggplant, zucchini, and stuffing peppers. The wrapped onion dolma are added on the bottom of a deep cooking pot and the stuffed vegetables, cabbage rolls, and stuffed vine leaves are layered on top of the onion dolmas. The entire pot of dolmas are cooked in sumac flavored water.

Seafood

There are also seafood variants of dolma. Stuffed mussels or Midye dolma may be filled with rice, onion, black pepper and pimento spice

The filling for kalamar dolma (stuffed calamari) is made from Halloumi cheese, onion, fresh bread crumbs, garlic and parsley. The whole tentacle is stuffed with the mixture and fried in a butter, olive oil and tomato sauce. For another variation a whole small squid may be stuffed with a bulgur and fresh herb mixture and baked in the oven.

Uskumru dolma (stuffed mackerel) is a staple of Istanbul cuisine. The version that was traditionally prepared by Armenian cooks is particularly well-regarded. After the fish is prepared by carefully separating the skin from the meat, the meat is sauteed with onions, currants, dried apricots, almonds, hazelnuts, pine nuts, walnuts, cinnamon, cloves, allspice, ginger, fresh herbs and lemon juice. The entire mixture is stuffed into the whole, intact skin. The stuffed mackerel is then either baked or preferably grilled long enough to brown the skin.

Sardines (sardalya) may be stuffed with a filling of kashar cheese, tomato, onion, dill and parsley. In Turkey, stuffed sardines may be served as a mezze platter at traditional taverns called meyhane.

Offal
There are several varieties of dolma made with offal. Dalak dolması, widely considered a delicacy of Armenian origin, is spleen stuffed with rice that has been seasoned with allspice, salt, pepper, mint, parsley and onion. It may be served an accompaniment with anise-flavored liquor like arak, rakı, ouzo or oghi.

Mumbar dolma is intestine stuffed with a moist mixture of ground meat, rice, pepper, cumin and salt. The stuffed intestine is then boiled in water until it is cooked thoroughly, after which it may be sliced and fried in butter before serving.

Fruit-based dolmas
There are some fruit-based dolmas as well like şekerli ayva dolması (stuffed quinces with a rice and currant filling, flavored with coriander, cinnamon and sugar) and pekmezli ayva dolması (meat and bulgur stuffed quince flavored with a traditional Turkish syrup, similar to molasses, called pekmez). Pekmez is also an ingredient in the meat-based variants of elma dolması (stuffed apples) and sarı erık dolması (stuffed yellow plums). Iranian Azerbaijanis and Persian Jews may serve stuffed quince, called dolma bay, as a Sabbath meal or during Sukkot.

One filling for stuffed apples is made from a high-quality cubed lamb shoulder called kuşbaşı, ground lamb, and rice. First black grapes are boiled together with sumac—the resulting sumac flavored grape juice is drained and reserved. The kuşbaşı lamb is cooked in this sumac flavored grape juice. The apples are stuffed with a mixture of ground lamb combined with rice, salt, pepper and layered in a pot on top of the cooked chunks of kuşbaşı. The apples are cooked in the remaining sumac flavored grape juice. Dried apricots and blanched almonds are added to the pot near the end of the cooking process. A meatless variant of the filling is made from a sauteed mixture of diced apples, diced pears, walnuts, hazelnut, currants, cinnamon, cloves, and star anise. The hollowed out apples are stuffed with the mixture and baked in the oven. This version may be garnished with powdered sugar.

Stuffed melons were part of the Ottoman palace cuisine. The recipe survives in modern Yemenite and Armenian cooking.

Religious celebrations and customs

It is customary for Jewish families to eat stuffed cabbage on Simchat Torah.

Assyrians prepare meatless dolmas for Lent.  When traditional ingredients are not available, the Armenian Christian community in West Bengal, India celebrates Christmas with potoler dorma, a local variation from Anglo-Indian cuisine. Stuffed vegetables called gemista or tsounidis are also common in Greek cuisine.

Muslim families often serve dolma as part of the iftar meal during Ramadan and during the Eid al-Fitr celebrations that mark the end of the holy month. Large pots of dolma are prepared during the Novruz festival.

See also
 Dolma Festival in Armenia
 List of stuffed dishes
 Sheikh al-mahshi, zucchini stuffed with minced lamb meat and pine nuts in yogurt sauce

References

Sources
 Alan Davidson, The Oxford Companion to Food. .
 
 

Stuffed vegetable dishes
Azerbaijani cuisine
Arab cuisine
Armenian cuisine
Assyrian cuisine
Balkan cuisine
Greek cuisine
Iranian cuisine
Iraqi cuisine
Cuisine of Georgia (country)
Kurdish cuisine
Levantine cuisine
Ottoman cuisine
Uzbek dishes
Algerian cuisine
Tunisian cuisine
National dishes
Sephardi Jewish cuisine
Mizrahi Jewish cuisine
Lenten foods
Iftar foods
Swedish cuisine
Syrian cuisine
Albanian cuisine
Offal dishes
Seafood dishes
Fruit dishes